12 Squadron, No. 12 Squadron or 12th Squadron may refer to:

 No. 12 Squadron RAAF, a unit of the Royal Australian Air Force
 No. 12 Squadron (Finland), a unit of the Finnish Air Force
 12 Squadron SAAF, a unit of the South African Air Force
 No. 12 Squadron SLAF, a unit of the Sri Lankan Air Force
 No. 12 Squadron RAF, a unit of the United Kingdom Royal Air Force
 12th Reconnaissance Squadron, a unit of the United States Air Force
 12th Fighter Squadron, a unit of the United States Air Force
 12th Missile Squadron, a unit of the United States Air Force
 12th Airborne Command and Control Squadron, a unit of the United States Air Force
 Attack Squadron 12 (VA-12), a unit of the United States Navy
 VFC-12 (Fighter Squadron Composite 12), a unit of the United States Navy
 Marine Aviation Logistics Squadron 12, a unit of the United States Marine Corps

See also
 XII Corps (disambiguation)
 12th Division (disambiguation)
 12th Brigade (disambiguation)
 12th Battalion (disambiguation)